{{Taxobox
| name = Candidatus Atelocyanobacterium thalassa| domain = Bacteria
| phylum = Cyanobacteria
| ordo = Chroococcales
| species = Ca. Atelocyanobacterium thalassa| genus_authority = Thompson et al., 2012
}}

Candidatus Atelocyanobacterium thalassa, also referred to as UCYN-A, is a diazotrophic species of cyanobacteria commonly found in measurable quantities throughout the world's oceans and some seas. Members of A. thalassa are spheroid in shape and are 1-2µm in diameter,  and provide nitrogen to ocean regions by fixing non biologically available atmospheric nitrogen into biologically available ammonium that other marine microorganisms can use. Unlike many other cyanobacteria, the genome of A. thalassa does not contain genes for RuBisCO, photosystem II, or the TCA cycle. Consequently, A. thalassa lacks the ability to fix carbon via photosynthesis. Some genes specific to the cyanobacteria group are also absent from the A. thalassa genome despite being an evolutionary descendant of this group. With the inability to fix their own carbon, A. thalassa are obligate symbionts that have been found within photosynthetic picoeukaryote algae. Most notably, the UCYN-A2 sublineage has been observed as an endosymbiont in the alga Braarudosphaera bigelowii with a minimum of 1-2 endosymbionts per host. A. thalassa fixes nitrogen for the algae, while the algae provide carbon for A. thalassa through photosynthesis. There are many sublineages of A. thalassa that are distributed across a wide range of marine environments and host organisms. It appears that some sublineages of A. thalassa have a preference for oligotrophic ocean waters while other sublineages prefer coastal waters. Much is still unknown about all of A. thalassa's hosts and host preferences.

Ecology

Nitrogen fixation 
Nitrogen fixation, which is the reduction of N2 to biologically available nitrogen, is an important source of N for aquatic ecosystems. For many decades, N2 fixation was vastly underestimated . The assumption that N2 fixation only occurred via Trichodesmium and Richelia led to the conclusion that in the oceans, nitrogen output exceeded the input. However, researchers found that the nitrogenase complex has variable evolutionary histories. The use of the polymerase chain reaction (PCR), removed the requirement of cultivation or microscopy to identify N2 fixing microorganisms. As a result, marine N2-fixing microorganisms other than Trichodesimum were found by sequencing PCR-amplified fragments of the gene nitrogenase (nifH) .Nitrogenase is the enzyme that catalyzes nitrogen fixation, and studies have shown that nifH is widely distributed throughout the different parts of the ocean. 

In 1989, a short nifH gene sequence was discovered, and 15 years later it was revealed to be an unusual cyanobacterium that is widely distributed. The microbe was originally given the name UCYN-A for "unicellular cyanobacteria group A". In research published in 1998, nifH sequences were amplified directly from water collected in the Pacific and Atlantic Oceans, and shown to be from bacterial, unicellular cyanobacterial nifH, Trichodesmium and diatom symbionts. With the use of cultivation-independent PCR and quantitative PCR (qPCR) targeting the nifH gene, studies found that A. thalassa is distributed in many ocean regions, showing that the oceanic plankton contain a broader range of nitrogen-fixing microorganisms than was previously believed.

Habitat 
The distribution of A. thalassa is cosmopolitan and is found throughout the world's oceans including the North Sea, Mediterranean Sea, Adriatic Sea, Red Sea, Arabian Sea, South China Sea, and the Coral Sea., further reinforcing its significant role in nitrogen fixation. Although A. thalassa is ubiquitous, its abundance is highly regulated by various abiotic factors such as temperature and nutrients. Studies have shown that it occupies cooler waters compared to other diazotrophs.  

There are four defined sublineages  of A. thalassa, namely, UCYN-A1, UCYN-A2, UCYN-A3, and UCYN-A4; studies have shown that these groups are adapted to different marine environments. UCYN-A1 and UCYN-A3 co-exist in open-ocean oligotrophic waters. while UCYN-A2 and UCYN-A4 co-exist in coastal waters. UCYN-A2 is typically found in high latitude temperate coastal waters. In addition, it can also be found co-occurring with UCYN-A4 in the coastal bodies of water. UCYN-A3 was found to be in greater abundance in the surface of the open ocean in the subtropics. In addition, UCYN-A3 has only been found to co-occur with UCYN-A1 thus far.

Metabolism

Obligate photoheterotroph 
Atelocyanobacterium thalassa is categorized as a photoheterotroph. Complete genome analysis reveals a reduced-size genome of 1.44 megabases, and the lack of pathways needed for metabolic self-sufficiency common to cyanobacteria. Genes are lacking for photosystem II of the photosynthetic apparatus, RuBisCO (ribulose-1,5-bisphosphate car­boxylase/oxygenase), and enzymes of the Calvin and tricarboxylic acid (TCA) cycle. Due to the lack of metabolically essential genes, A. thalassa requires external sources of carbon and other biosynthetic compounds. As well, A. thalassa lacks the tricarboxylic acid cycle, but expresses a putative dicarboxylic-acid transporter. This suggests that A. thalassa fills its requirement for dicarboxylic acids from an external source. The complete or partial lack of biosynthetic enzymes required for valine, leucine, isoleucine, phenylalanine, tyrosine and tryptophan biosynthesis further suggests the need for external sources of amino acids. However, A. thalassa still possesses the Fe-III transport genes (afuABC), which should allow for the transport of Fe-III into the cell.

Obligate symbiosis 
Atelocyanobacterium thalassa is an obligate symbiote of the calcifying haptophyte alga Braarudosphaera bigelowii. Stable isotope experiments revealed that A. thalassa fixes 15N2 and exchanges fixed nitrogen with the partner, while H13CO3- was fixed by B. bigelowii and exchanged to A. thalassa. A. thalassa receives ~16% of the total carbon of the symbiotic partner, and exchanges ~85 -95% of total fixed nitrogen in return.

Atelocyanobacterium  thalassa must live in close physical association with its metabolically dependent symbiosis partner; however, the details of the physical interaction are still unclear due to a lack of clear microscopy images. Atelocyanobacterium thalassa may be a true endosymbiont and fully enclosed within the host’s cell membrane or has molecular mechanisms to allow for secure attachment and transfer of metabolites. This symbiotic connection must not allow the passage of oxygen while maintaining an exchange of fixed nitrogen and carbon. Such close symbiosis also requires signalling pathways between the partners and synchronized growth.

Daytime N-fixation 
Atelocyanobacterium  thalassa is unicellular, hence it does not have specialized cellular compartments (heterocysts) to protect the nitrogenase (nifH) from oxygen exposure. Other nitrogen-fixing organisms employ temporal separation by fixing nitrogen only at night-time, however, A. thalassa has been found to express the nifH gene during the daylight. This is possible due to the absence of photosystem II and, therefore, oxygen and transcriptional control. It is hypothesized that the day-time nitrogen-fixation is more energy-efficient than night-time fixation common in other diazotrophs because light energy can be used directly for the energy-intensive nitrogen fixation.

Life cycle 
The lifecycle of A. thalassa is not well understood. As an obligate endosymbiont, A. thalassa is thought to be unable to survive outside of the host, suggesting its entire life cycle takes place inside of the host. The division and replication of A. thalassa are at least partially under the control of the host cell. It is thought that a signal transduction pathway exists to regulate the amount of A. thalassa cells within the host to ensure a sufficient amount of A. thalassa cells are supplied to the host's daughter cell during cell division.

Diversity 
Genomic analysis of A. thalassa shows a wide variety of nifH gene sequences. Thus, this group of cyanobacteria can be divided into genetically distinct sublineages, four of which have been identified and defined. Sequences belonging to A. thalassa have been found in nearly all oceanic bodies. The lineages of A. thalassa are split by their determining oligotypes. There is a very high level of similarity between all sublineages in their amino-acid sequences, but some variance was found in their nifH sequences. The oligotypes of A. thalassa  are based on its nitrogenase (nifH) sequences, and reveal thirteen positions of variance (entropy). The variances would cause different oligotypes/sublineages of A. thalassa to be found in different relative abundances and have different impacts on the ecosystems where they are found.

Oligotyping 

Four main sublineages have been identified from oligotype analysis, and their respective oligotypes are: UCYN-A1/ Oligo1, UCYN-A2/Oligo2, UCYN-A3/Oligo3, UCYN-A4/Oligo4. UCYN-A1 was the most abundant oligotype found across the oceans. The UCYN-A1 sublineage has an abundance of nitrogenase in a range of 104 - 107 copies of nifH per litre. UCYN-A1 and UCYN-A2 also have a significantly reduced genome size. UCYN-A2 differs from UCYN-A1 in that its oligo2 oligotyping has 10/13 differing positions of entropy from oligo1 (UCYN-A1). UCYN-A3 differs from UCYN-A1 with its oligo3 differing from oligo1 with an entropy position difference of 8/13. UCYN-A4 also differs from UCYN-A1 by 8/13 entropy positions in a different set.

References

External links 
HAMAP: cyanobacterium UCYN-A complete proteome
 Life Stripped Down
UCYN-A, la cyanobactérie qui fixe l'azote mais ignore la photosynthèse French journal article about UCYN-A
Globally Distributed Uncultivated Oceanic N2-Fixing Cyanobacteria Lack Oxygenic Photosystem II

Environmental microbiology
Chroococcales
Candidatus taxa

Marine microorganisms